Vonko (fl. 1400-1401) was a "Serb-Albanian-Bulgarian-Vlach" who conquered Arta from the Spata family in 1400, holding it until late 1401, when the Spatas regained the town.

Not much is known of him. In a Greek monastic chronicle, the Chronicle of Proclus and Comnenus (also known as the Chronicle of Ioannina) from the Panteleimon monastery at Ioannina, the last inclusion mentions: "October 29, on Wednesday (1400), Despot Spatas enters Eternity (dies). Immediately afterwards, his brother Sgouros holds Arta. After some days, the Serb-Albanian-Bulgarian-Vlach Bokoes (Vonko) attacked and expelled Sgouros, and started to round up all the elders and imprisoned them in the fort, and he destroyed their possessions." He treated the citizens badly, and they called on the Republic of Venice for help.

By the end of 1401, Vonko had been driven out from Arta. Sgouros did not retain the town, instead his nephew Maurice Spata took over Arta and Sgouros took over Angelokastron. No more is mentioned of him.

G. Schiro, who studied the genealogy of Spata, assumed that the name (Bokoes in the original text) is a variant of Bua, based on linguistic data and the fact that Bua initially had the form of Buchia.

Annotations

 or Bokoi in other languages.

Notes

References
 
Ivo Banač, The national question in Yugoslavia: origins, history, politics
Traian Stoianovich, Balkan worlds: the first and last Europe
Apostolos Euangelou Vakalopoulos,Origins of the Greek nation: the Byzantine period, 1204-1461
Steven G. Ellis, Lud'a Klusáková, Imagining frontiers, contesting identities
 

14th-century births
15th-century deaths
15th-century Serbian people
15th-century Albanian people
15th-century Bulgarian people
Arta, Greece
Medieval Epirus
Medieval Albanian nobility
Aromanian people